Aubrey Simons (1921–2014) was a male former international table tennis player from England.

He won a gold medal at the 1953 World Table Tennis Championships in the Swaythling Cup (men's team) event with Richard Bergmann, Adrian Haydon, Johnny Leach and Brian Kennedy for England.

In addition he won another five medals at the World Table Tennis Championships including a mixed doubles silver medal with Helen Elliot at the 1955 World Table Tennis Championships.

He also won two English Open titles.

He died in 2014.

See also
 List of table tennis players
 List of World Table Tennis Championships medalists
 List of England players at the World Team Table Tennis Championships

References

English male table tennis players
1921 births
2014 deaths
World Table Tennis Championships medalists